Florissant  is a city in St. Louis County, Missouri, within Greater St. Louis. It is a middle class, second-ring northern suburb of St. Louis. Based on the 2020 United States census, the city had a total population of 52,533, making it the 12th-largest city in Missouri and the largest municipality in St. Louis County.

History
The exact date the first settlers went to the Valley of Florissant is unknown, but it is one of the oldest settlements in the state of Missouri. Some historians believe it was settled about the same time as St. Louis. The first civil government was formed in 1786. Spanish archives in Havana reveal 40 people and seven plantations were in Florissant at the time of the 1787 census. The village, called "Fleurissant", meaning "Blooming" in English, by its French settlers and "St. Ferdinand" by its Spanish rulers, was a typical French village with its commons and common fields. Originally a separate town, and now an inner suburb of St. Louis, the community was centered on (and frequently called after) the parish of St. Ferdinand. 

In c. 1809, the Cold Water Cemetery had the first burial, since 2004 it has been listed in the National Register of Historic Places for its social history.

As late as 1889, the town was predominantly French-speaking (while the southern portion of the metropolis was populated by German-speakers). The first train line to the area was constructed in 1878—an extension of the line which went from St. Louis City to Normandy. The last train to Florissant ran on November 14, 1931.

Following World War II, Florissant went from a small village community to a large suburban center, as developers such as Alfred H. Mayer Co. began building subdivisions on what was formerly farmland and empty acreage. Around 18,000 houses were built between 1947 and 1980, and the population swelled to its peak of about 76,000 in the mid-1970s, making it the largest city in St. Louis County.

James J. Eagan was the first mayor of Florissant after a charter amendment created the position. He ultimately served 37 years from 1963 until his death on November 2, 2000, being re-elected into office nine times, and became one of the longest-serving mayors of any city in the United States. In his final year, he was awarded the title of Best Politician in St. Louis by the Riverfront Times. The civic center off Parker Road is named the James J. Eagan Community Center in his memory.

In 2012, Florissant was ranked 76 in Money magazine's top-100 list of Best Places to Live – America's Best Small Cities. In 2014, Florissant ranked as the #1 Best Small City to Retire To in America and the second-safest city in Missouri.

The heart of Old Town Florissant is listed on the National Register of Historic Places as the St. Ferdinand Central Historic District. The boundaries of the district are roughly rue St. Francois, rue St. Ferdinand, and rue St. Denis, and Lafayette Street. The City of St. Ferdinand Multiple Resource Area (MRA), located in the oldest section of the present city of Florissant, encompasses approximately 156 city blocks and encloses the approximate area of the City of St. Ferdinand, as Florissant was known from 1857 to 1939. This MRA comprises 124 historically significant properties ranging in date from 1790 to 1940. The historic Old St. Ferdinand Shrine is located on the western end of Old Town. The Shrine and Historic Site consists of four historic buildings on their original locations: the 1819 convent, 1821 church, 1840 rectory, and 1888 schoolhouse. It is listed individually on the National Register of Historic Places and is a U.S. Historic District.

Historic Florissant, the local historical society, operates out of the preserved Gittemeier House.

Geography

Demographics

2010 census
At the 2010 census, there were 52,158 people, 21,247 households and 13,800 families living in the city. The racial makeup of the city was 58.3% White, 36.8% African American, 0.2% Native American, 0.8% Asian, 0.6% from other races, and 2.3% from two or more races. Hispanic or Latino people of any race were 2.0% of the population.

There were 21,247 households, of which 32.3% had children under the age of 18 living with them, 42.4% were married couples living together, 17.5% had a female householder with no husband present, 5.1% had a male householder with no wife present, and 35.0% were non-families. 29.9% of all households were made up of individuals, and 12.2% had someone living alone who was 65 years of age or older. The average household size was 2.42 and the average family size was 3.00.

The median age in the city was 38 years. 23.9% of residents were under the age of 18; 8.6% were between the ages of 18 and 24; 26.2% were from 25 to 44; 25.8% were from 45 to 64; and 15.5% were 65 years of age or older. The gender makeup of the city was 46.8% male and 53.2% female.

2000 census
At the 2000 census, there were 50,497 people, 20,399 households and 13,687 families living in the city. The racial makeup of the city was 86.66% White, 10.51% African American, 0.20% Native American, 0.61% Asian, 0.03% Pacific Islander, 0.52% from other races, and 1.48% from two or more races. Hispanic or Latino people of any race were 1.49% of the population.

There were 20,399 households, of which 30.7% had children under the age of 18 living with them, 49.8% were married couples living together, 13.2% had a female householder with no husband present, and 32.9% were non-families. 28.8% of all households were made up of individuals, and 12.3% had someone living alone who was 65 years of age or older. The average household size was 2.44 and the average family size was 3.01.

24.7% of the population were under the age of 18, 8.2% from 18 to 24, 29.9% from 25 to 44, 20.0% from 45 to 64, and 17.1% who were 65 years of age or older. The median age was 37 years. For every 100 females, there were 89.5 males. For every 100 females age 18 and over, there were 84.1 males.

The median household income was $44,462 and the median family income was $52,195. Males had a median income of $37,434 compared with $27,247 for females. The per capita income for the city was $20,622. About 2.7% of families and 4.0% of the population were below the poverty line, including 4.5% of those under age 18 and 3.7% of those age 65 or over.

Education

Public
Florissant is covered by the Hazelwood and Ferguson-Florissant public school districts. McCluer North High School and McCluer High School of the Ferguson-Florissant School District, and North Technical High School are high schools in Florissant. Hazelwood Central is the only high school in Florissant belonging to the Hazelwood School District. Hazelwood Northwest Middle School and several elementary schools are also within the municipal limits.

Private
North County Christian School is a pre-school to grade 12 Christian school that is theologically associated with the Church of the Nazarene.

There are several kindergarten through 8th-grade parochial schools in Florissant. These include Atonement Lutheran School, Sacred Heart, St. Ferdinand, St. Rose Philippine Duchesne and Saint Norbert.

Higher education
Florissant has a theological college, an extension campus, and a barber college. Saint Louis Christian College is a private, four-year, undergraduate institution that is theologically and ecclesiastically associated with the Christian Churches and Churches of Christ. Lindenwood University has its offsite North County Campus located in the former Our Lady of Fatima School. Missouri School of Barbering and Hairstyling-St Louis is also located in Florissant.

St. Louis Community College–Florissant Valley and University of Missouri–St. Louis are located in close proximity to the city.

Public libraries
St. Louis County Library operates the Florissant Valley Branch in Florissant.

Health care
Florissant is home to Northwest HealthCare, an outpatient subsidiary of Christian Hospital. Services include: emergency department, sleep lab, bone density testing, mammography, ultrasound and MRI. A satellite facility of the Alvin J. Siteman Cancer Center that is under construction on the campus is scheduled to open in late 2019.

Notable people

See also 

 National Register of Historic Places listings in St. Louis County, Missouri

References

Further reading

External links
 Official site of the City of Florissant
 Historic Florissant

Cities in St. Louis County, Missouri
Populated places established in 1786
Missouri populated places on the Missouri River
French colonial settlements of Upper Louisiana
Cities in Missouri